Henry Enamorado (born 5 August 1977, in Santa Bárbara, Honduras) is a Honduran former goalkeeper.

International career

He was a member of the Honduras national football team in 2001 Copa América where Honduras finished in a historic 3rd Place.

In the third-place Match, Enamorado saved a penalty kick of the Uruguayan player Carlos Eduardo Gutiérrez.

References

1977 births
Living people
Association football goalkeepers
Honduran footballers
Honduras international footballers
Liga Nacional de Fútbol Profesional de Honduras players
F.C. Motagua players
Platense F.C. players
2001 Copa América players